Peta Teanet was a South African disco musician of Shangaan descent.

He lived at Thapane village, in Bolobedu south at Ga-Modjadji. He was killed by a policeman in Bushbuckridge Acornhoek during an argument. He attended high school at Kgwekgwe High School in Moleketla Village, Bolobedu South. He became fluent in Shona and also had a couple of songs he sang in Shona. He was born in South Africa. His debut album, Maxaka (we are relatives) was recorded in 1988. His music was influenced by Paul Ndlovu. He is the third born of Emma Teanet who was also a musician. Peta Teanet was the best and king of Xitsonga Disco Music during his time, he played his music with artists like: Penny Penny who was his friend, Foster Teanet his younger brother, Joe Shirimane and many more.
He was one of the xitsonga disco musician. The former ward 11 under Greater Tzaneen Local Municipality, Mopani District, has now changed its name to Peta Teanet ward.

Peta Teanet productions : Emma Teanet (mom) ;Fosta Teanet (Brother);Jeanet Teanet (daughter) ;Vuyelwa (wife) ;Shamila (Wife) ; Ashante ;Girlie Mafurha ;Linah Khama; Samsom Mthombheni ;The BIG T;Wireless Julius Bomba; Luz de Sá na Tinito wa le Mozambique.  Peta helped the soul lovers and General Musca ;Penny Penny ;Sunglen Chabalala ; Nurse Matlala and Candy N'wayingwani on how to make music.

Peta was a diamond  who was undefeated in Xitsonga disco from 1988-1996.

The death of this legendary man can better be explained by the Acornhoek residents, this is where Peta Teanet was last seen performing. Acornhoek the Death place of the king of Xitsonga Disco. May his lovely soul rest in perfect peace and he will always be missed by his family and fans.

Discography
(1988) Maxaka
(1989) Divorce Case
(1990) More Hits From Peta Teanet
(1991) The Gospel Album with The Special Servants
(1991) The Real Peta Teanet
(1992) Saka Naye Jive
(1992) The Heroes Peta Teanet and Paul Ndlovu 

(1993) Jahman Teanet
(1993) Uta ku Tsakisa
(1994) Peta Will Excite You
(1995) Double Pashash
(1996) King Of Shangaan Disco

References

South African musicians
Tsonga people
People from Soweto
1996 deaths
Year of birth missing